Tayozhny/Tayezhny (masculine), Tayozhnaya/Tayezhnaya (feminine), or Tayozhnoye/Tayezhnoye (neuter) is the name of several inhabited localities in Russia.

Urban localities
Tayozhny, Khanty-Mansi Autonomous Okrug, an urban-type settlement in Sovetsky District of Khanty-Mansi Autonomous Okrug

Rural localities
Tayozhny, Amur Oblast, a settlement in Dzhalindinsky Rural Settlement of Skovorodinsky District in Amur Oblast; 
Tayozhny, Arkhangelsk Oblast, a settlement in Shilegsky Selsoviet of Pinezhsky District in Arkhangelsk Oblast; 
Tayozhny, Republic of Buryatia, a settlement in Iroysky Somon of Selenginsky District in the Republic of Buryatia; 
Tayozhny, Nizhneudinsky District, Irkutsk Oblast, an area in Nizhneudinsky District of Irkutsk Oblast
Tayozhny, Shelekhovsky District, Irkutsk Oblast, a settlement in Shelekhovsky District of Irkutsk Oblast
Tayozhny, Zalarinsky District, Irkutsk Oblast, an area in Zalarinsky District of Irkutsk Oblast
Tayozhny, Kamchatka Krai, a settlement in Milkovsky District of Kamchatka Krai
Tayozhny, Kemerovo Oblast, a settlement under the administrative jurisdiction of Tayga Town Under Oblast Jurisdiction in Kemerovo Oblast
Tayozhny, Boguchansky District, Krasnoyarsk Krai, a settlement in Tayozhninsky Selsoviet of Boguchansky District in Krasnoyarsk Krai
Tayozhny, Kezhemsky District, Krasnoyarsk Krai, a settlement in Tayozhinsky Selsoviet of Kezhemsky District in Krasnoyarsk Krai
Tayozhny, Perm Krai, a settlement in Permsky District of Perm Krai
Tayezhny, Primorsky Krai, a settlement in Nadezhdinsky District of Primorsky Krai
Tayozhny, Alapayevsky District, Sverdlovsk Oblast, a settlement in Tayozhny Selsoviet of Alapayevsky District in Sverdlovsk Oblast
Tayozhny, Lesnoy, Sverdlovsk Oblast, a settlement under the administrative jurisdiction of Yelkino Work Settlement under the administrative jurisdiction of the closed administrative-territorial formation of Lesnoy in Sverdlovsk Oblast
Tayozhnoye, Khabarovsk Krai, a selo in Khabarovsky District of Khabarovsk Krai
Tayozhnoye, Krasnoyarsk Krai, a selo in Tayozhensky Selsoviet of Kansky District in Krasnoyarsk Krai
Tayozhnoye, Primorsky Krai, a selo in Krasnoarmeysky District of Primorsky Krai
Tayozhnaya, a village in Borodinsky Selsoviet of Bogradsky District in the Republic of Khakassia